The 2004 British GT season consisted of an eight-round series of sports car racing in the British GT Championship, with each round consisting of two races. The series was open to N-GT and GT Cup class cars. Jonathan Cocker won the N-GT Class Driver's Championship, whilst Adam Wilcox and Ni Amorim shared the GT Cup Driver's Championship.

Entry list

N-GT
{|
|

GT Cup
{|
|

Calendar and results

Championship standings

Drivers' Championships

N-GT

Note: bold signifies pole position, italics signifies fastest lap.

Points were awarded as follows: 10-8-6-5-4-3-2-1 from first to eighth.

GT Cup

Note: bold signifies pole position, italics signifies fastest lap.

Points were awarded as follows: 10-8-6-5-4-3-2-1 from first to eighth.

References

British GT Championship seasons
GT Championship